Keith Lander Best (born 10 June 1949) is a former Conservative Party politician in the United Kingdom. He was Member of Parliament (MP) for Anglesey from 1979 when he gained the seat from Labour until 1983, and for the renamed Ynys Môn from 1983 to 1987. He was Parliamentary Private Secretary to the Secretary of State for Wales from 1981 to 1984.

He resigned his seat in 1987 following the revelation by the Labour Research Department that he had made multiple share applications in the BT offer (for which he was later convicted). He has since led the organisations Prisoners Abroad (1989–1993), the Immigration Advisory Service (1993–2009), Freedom from Torture (2010–2014) and SurvivorsUK (2015-2018).

Biography
Keith Best was born in Brighton, and was educated at Brighton College and Keble College, Oxford, before becoming a barrister in 1973. He served in the Territorial Army Royal Horse Artillery 289 Para Bty and Royal Artillery in airborne and commando forces and as a Naval Gunfire Support Liaison Officer 1967–89, reaching the rank of Major, awarded the Territorial Decoration (TD) and as a Brighton Borough councillor 1976–80.

After his election to Parliament Best was driving when his car was involved in an accident resulting in the death of his personal assistant; he was cleared of responsibility.

During the privatisation of British Telecom, individuals were limited to a single allocation of shares. Best submitted several applications by using minor variations of his name. On 30 September 1987, he was sentenced to four months' imprisonment for this deception and was fined £3,000. On 5 October 1987, the Court of Appeal ruled that his jail sentence was too harsh, and Best was released but his fine was increased to £4,500.

In 1987 his successor as MP for Ynys Mon was Plaid Cymru candidate Ieuan Wyn Jones. In 2000 Best failed in a bid for reselection by the Conservative Party in Ynys Môn.

In 1987 he became the Chairman of the Executive Committee of the World Federalist Movement, but he transitioned to the Secretary role in 2018. He is the former Chair of Parliamentarians Global Action. He was Director of Prisoners Abroad 1989–93. He was Chief Executive of the Immigration Advisory Service 1993–2009. He was Chairman of the Council of the Electoral Reform Society 1998–2003 and served on its Council for fifteen years. He was Chairman of Electoral Reform International Services Ltd 2004–14. He is Chairman of Conservative Action for Electoral Reform. In 2003, he was named by The Guardian as one of the 100 most influential people in public services in the UK.

In April 2010 he took up the post of Chief Executive of Freedom from Torture (formerly Medical Foundation for the Care of Victims of Torture), where he remained until 2014. He was then appointed the first Chief Executive of SurvivorsUK which he left in April 2017 in order to undertake consultancy and more charity work. He is currently Chair of the Universal Peace Federation (UK), Chair of the Wyndham Place Charlemagne Trust charity and of Charity 2020 as well as Secretary of both the European Movement and the Parliamentary Outreach Trust. In October he was appointed to the Board of ARHAG Housing Association and as Secretary of the PCC of St James's Church, Piccadilly, London.

He is married to Elizabeth Gibson, former Chief Executive of the charity the Evelina Family Trust and Office Manager of British Future; and they have two daughters. When his wife stood as the Conservative candidate for Birmingham Hodge Hill at the 1992 general election, Best acted as her election agent.

In 2017, Best became one of the founding members of Citizens for Britain. He is the author of Write Your Own Will 1978, The Right Way to Prove a Will, 1981 and of various articles in magazines, Wall Street Journal, newspapers etc. Former Deputy Editor District Council Review. He contributed a chapter to the 2021 book Religious Soft Diplomacy and the United Nations: Religious Engagement as Loyal Opposition.

References

Bibliography
 Times Guide to the House of Commons, 1987
 Chronicle of the 20th Century
 Keith Best papers National Library of Wales
 All articles by Keith Best in The Guardian

External links 
 
 Comment from Keith Best on cuts to public services, in response to statement from Sir Stephen Bubb in the Guardian on 10 May 2012
 Old Brightonians alumni website interview Keith Best Old Brightonian website

1949 births
Living people
Conservative Party (UK) MPs for Welsh constituencies
UK MPs 1979–1983
UK MPs 1983–1987
Councillors in East Sussex
Alumni of Keble College, Oxford
British charity and campaign group workers
Royal Artillery officers
People from Brighton
People educated at Brighton College
British politicians convicted of fraud
British politicians convicted of crimes
Conservative Party (UK) councillors